
King of Gate is an annual single-elimination professional wrestling singles tournament held in the Japanese promotion Dragon Gate. It is the successor to El Numero Uno, previously held in Dragon Gate and Toryumon, although Uno was a round-robin tournament, as opposed to the single-elimination format used by King of Gate. In 2016, King of Gate adopted a round robin format with four separate blocks.

Results

List of winners

2005

The 2005 King of Gate was a 26-man tournament held from December 23 to December 27 over 5 daily shows. Due to the uneven number of participants, six were given byes to the second round.

2006

The 2006 King of Gate was a 15-man tournament held from December 10 to December 22 over four shows. The 2005 winner, Ryo Saito, received a bye to the second round.

2007

The 2007 King of Gate was a 16-man tournament, held from December 1 to December 9 over seven shows.

2008

The 2008 King of Gate tournament, a sixteen-man tournament, was held from December 2 to December 19, covering six shows.  Before the tournament started, current Open the Dream Gate Champion Shingo Takagi pulled out, and was replaced by Madoka, who won a Battle Royal on November 29 for the 16th and final spot.

2010

After being postponed in 2009, the King of Gate will returned in April 2010.  Sixteen wrestlers will occupied two blocks of eight each.  The first round of Block A was on April 3, with the first round of Block B took place on April 4.  Quarterfinal action was on April 9 and 10.  The semifinals and finals of the tournament occurred on April 14.

2011

The 2011 King of Gate tournament, a sixteen-man tournament, was held from May 12 to May 21, covering six shows.

2012

The 2012 King of Gate tournament, a sixteen-man tournament, took place from May 10 to May 19, covering six shows.

2013
The 2013 King of Gate tournament, a sixteen-man tournament, took take place from May 10 to May 25, covering seven shows.

2014
The 2014 King of Gate tournament, a sixteen-man tournament, took take place from May 9 to May 31, covering nine shows.

2015 
The 2015 King of Gate tournament, a sixteen-man tournament, took take place from May 8 to May 30, covering seven shows.

2016 
The 2016 King of Gate tournament, a round robin tournament, featuring 4 blocks. It took place from May 8 to June 12, covering twenty shows.

2017 
The 2017 King of Gate tournament, a round robin tournament, featuring 4 blocks. It took place from May 9 to June 11.

2018 
The 2018 King of Gate tournament, a round robin tournament, featuring 4 blocks and will take place from May 8 to June 10. The winner of each respective block will advance to a single elimination tournament that will take place on June 1 & June 9. The winner of this tournament receives a Dream Gate title match on June 10. The fighter with the lowest point total in each block will also compete in a single elimination tournament, to be held on June 2 & 3 to decide overall last place. Eita took part in the last place tournament due to Dragon Kid's injuries.

2019
The 2019 King of Gate tournament, a round robin tournament, featuring 4 blocks took place from May 9 to June 8. The semi-finals and finals took place on June 6 and 8, respectively. U-T forfeited the rest of his matches due to injury. Ben-K is the first wrestler to go undefeated in the King of Gate tournament since the format change from single-elimination to round-robin.

2020
The 2020 King of Gate tournament took place from May 15 to June 7, covering ten shows. Unlike the previous year, the tournament featured a singles elimination tournament contested by 24 wrestlers. Due to the coronavirus (COVID-19) pandemic in Japan, the tournament was held in empty arenas, with the tournament also being aired on tape delay.

* = Won a second chance battle royal also involving H.Y.O, Kzy, Ryo Saito, Yosuke♥Santa Maria, Genki Horiguchi, Jason Lee, Ben-K and Dragon Dia to secure the last semifinal spot.

2021

The 2021 King of Gate tournament took place from May 14 to June 3, covering fifteen shows. The tournament will see the return of the round-robin format, featuring 3 blocks. Repeating part of the previous year format, the final semifinal spot will be decided in a battle royal by a wrestler eliminated from the tournament. On May 7, it was announced that HipHop Kikuta would be forced to withdraw from the tournament, after suffering a shoulder injury, being replaced by his R.E.D stablemate H.Y.O. Ben-K forfeited all of his matches after testing positive for COVID-19. Naruki Doi, who wrestled Ben-K on the first day of the tournament, also withdrew from the tournament as a precaution.

* = Won a second chance battle royal also involving H.Y.O, Shun Skywalker, Keisuke Okuda, Kaito Ishida, Diamante, BxB Hulk, Takashi Yoshida, Jason Lee, Dragon Kid, Susumu Yokosuka, and Eita to secure the last semifinal spot.

2022
The 2022 King of Gate will take place between May 11th to June 3rd. The tournament will revert to a single elimination format featuring 32 participants.

* = Won a second chance battle royal also involving H.Y.O, Kai, Dragon Dia, Yosuke Santa Maria, Mondai Ryu, Madoka Kikuta, Naruki Doi, Ben-K, U-T, Kagetora, Takuma Fujiwara, Ishin Iihashi, Kzy, Keisuke Okuda, Kaito Ishida, Diamante, BxB Hulk, Takashi Yoshida, Jacky "Funky" Kamei, SB Kento, Dragon Kid, Susumu Mochizuki, Yamato, Minorita, Strong Machine J, La Estrella and Eita to replace an injured Jason Lee in the semi-finals.

References
PuroLove.com
DGUSA

External links
Dragon Gate official site in Japanese

Professional wrestling tournaments
Dragon Gate (wrestling)